Loray Mill Historic District is a national historic district located at Gastonia, Gaston County, North Carolina. It encompasses 649 contributing buildings, 2 contributing sites, and 1 contributing structure in a predominantly residential section of Gastonia. The district includes the five-story brick Loray Mill (1900, 1901, 1921-1922) and all or parts of some thirty blocks of frame mill houses constructed primarily between the early 1900s and the 1920s. They include notable examples of Colonial Revival, Gothic Revival, and Bungalow / American Craftsman architecture. Other notable buildings include the Loray Baptist Church (1952).

It was listed on the National Register of Historic Places in 2001, with a boundary increase in 2006.

The district will soon be linked to the Main Avenue section of downtown Gastonia via the FUSE District that will include a new stadium. This stadium will have artificial turf and can be configured for baseball, soccer, football, rugby, and concerts to spur economic growth and investment in the area near the Loray Mill Historic District.

References

External links

Historic districts on the National Register of Historic Places in North Carolina
Gothic Revival architecture in North Carolina
Colonial Revival architecture in North Carolina
Buildings and structures in Gaston County, North Carolina
Historic American Engineering Record in North Carolina
National Register of Historic Places in Gaston County, North Carolina